James Matthew Hendrix (born January 22, 1981) is an American professional golfer who plays on the Web.com Tour and played as a member of the PGA Tour during the 2007 season.

Amateur career
Hendrix was born in Aiken, South Carolina. He qualified for the 1997 U.S. Junior Amateur, was the top rated junior golfer in South Carolina, and won the 2003 Sunnehanna Amateur. He played on the 2003 Walker Cup team. He played college golf at Clemson University and was a member of the team that won the 2003 NCAA Championship and Atlantic Coast Conference Championship.

Professional career
Hendrix turned professional in 2004. He finished T29 at the 2006 Q School, earning his PGA Tour card for the 2007 season.  He did not finish high enough on the money list to retain his PGA Tour card past the 2007 season.  

Hendrix spent the 2006, 2011, and 2012 seasons on the Nationwide Tour.  

Hendrix has two wins on the NGA Pro Golf Tour.

Professional wins
2011 Brunswick Plantation, Legends Parkland (NGA/Hooters Tour Carolina Winter Series)

U.S. national team appearances
Amateur
Walker Cup:  2003

See also
2006 PGA Tour Qualifying School graduates

References

External links

American male golfers
Clemson Tigers men's golfers
PGA Tour golfers
Golfers from South Carolina
Sportspeople from Aiken, South Carolina
Sportspeople from Greenville, South Carolina
1981 births
Living people